The 1974 Coliseum Mall International, also known as the Hampton Indoor, was a men's tennis tournament played on indoor carpet courts at the Hampton Roads Coliseum in Hampton, Virginia in the United States that was part of the 1974 USLTA Indoor Circuit. It was the fifth edition of the tournament and was held from March 4 through March 10, 1974. First-seeded player Jimmy Connors won his second consecutive singles title and earned $10,000 first-prize money.

Finals

Singles
 Jimmy Connors defeated  Ilie Năstase 6–4, 6–4
 It was Connors' 6th singles title of the year and the 23rd of his career.

Doubles
 Željko Franulović /  Nikola Pilić defeated  Pat Cramer /  Mike Estep 6–3, 1–2, retired

References

External links
 ITF tournament edition details

Coliseum Mall International
Coliseum Mall International
Coliseum Mall International
1974 in sports in Virginia